Vee is a surname, mostly as initialism of names starting with V-. Notable people with the surname include:
 Bobby Vee (Velline) (1943-2016), American pop singer
 Cristina Vee, American voice actress
 Jimmy Vee, British actor and stunt performer
 Krystal Vee (born 1987), Thai model and actress
 Tesco Vee (born 1955), American singer and musician
 Vivien Vee (born 1960), stage name of Viviana Andreattini, Italian singer